{{DISPLAYTITLE:3-Deoxy-D-manno-oct-2-ulosonic acid}}

3-Deoxy--manno-oct-2-ulosonic acid (ketodeoxyoctonic acid; KDO; IUPAC symbol Kdo) is an ulosonic acid of a 2-ketooctose which is used by bacteria in the synthesis of lipopolysaccharides. The -manno prefix indicates that the four chiral centers have the same configuration as -mannose.

References

Sugar acids